Blendi Idrizi (born 2 May 1998) is a Kosovan professional footballer who plays as a attacking midfielder for 2. Bundesliga club Jahn Regensburg, on loan from Schalke 04. Born in Germany, he represents the Kosovo national team.

Club career

Early career and return to Blau-Weiß Friesdorf
Idrizi at the age of 13 started playing football in Blau-Weiß Friesdorf, where after one year it was transferred to Bonner SC. He besides being was part of Bonner SC, he was part even of TSC Euskirchen (2014–2015) and 1. FC Köln (2015–2017). In the 2017–18 season, Idrizi returns to his former team, Blau-Weiß Friesdorf, but now as a senior team's player and scores 16 goals in 25 games.

Alemannia Aachen
On 14 May 2018, Idrizi joined Regionalliga West side Alemannia Aachen. On 29 July 2018, he made his debut in a 2–1 away defeat against Viktoria Köln after coming on as a substitute at 58th minute in place of Mahmut Temür.

Fortuna Köln
On 25 June 2019, Idrizi joined Regionalliga West side Fortuna Köln. On 10 August 2019, he made his debut in a 1–1 home draw against Wattenscheid 09 after being named in the starting line-up.

Schalke 04
On 29 January 2020, Idrizi joined Regionalliga West side Schalke 04 II. Three days later, he made his debut in a 2–0 home win against his former club Bonner SC after coming on as a substitute in the 74th minute in place of Jason Ceka.

On 12 May 2021, Idrizi made his first team debut in a 2–1 away defeat against Hertha BSC, starting the match before being substituted off in the 77th minute for Steven Skrzybski. Three days after debut, he scored his first goal for Schalke 04 in his second appearance for the club in a 4–3 home win over Eintracht Frankfurt in Bundesliga.

Loan to Jahn Regensburg
On 30 August 2022, Idrizi joined 2. Bundesliga side Jahn Regensburg, on a season-long loan.

International career

Under-21
On 22 May 2017, Idrizi received a call-up from Kosovo U21 for a three-day training camp. On 9 October 2019, he received again a call-up from Kosovo U21 for the 2021 UEFA European Under-21 Championship qualification match against Albania U21, and made his debut after coming on as a substitute in the 88th minute in place of Gezim Pepsi.

Senior
On 25 May 2021, Idrizi received a call-up from Kosovo for the friendly matches against San Marino and Malta. Seven days later, he made his debut with Kosovo in a friendly match against San Marino after being named in the starting line-up.

Personal life
Idrizi was born in Bonn, Germany to Kosovo Albanian parents from Gjilan.

Career statistics

Club

International

Honours
Schalke 04
2. Bundesliga: 2021–22

References

External links

1998 births
Living people
Sportspeople from Bonn
Footballers from North Rhine-Westphalia
Association football midfielders
Kosovan footballers
Kosovo under-21 international footballers
Kosovo international footballers
Kosovan expatriate footballers
Kosovan expatriate sportspeople in Germany
German footballers
German people of Kosovan descent
German people of Albanian descent
Alemannia Aachen players
SC Fortuna Köln players
FC Schalke 04 II players
FC Schalke 04 players
SSV Jahn Regensburg players
Bundesliga players
2. Bundesliga players
Regionalliga players